Giovanni Paolo "Gianpaolo" Zandegiacomo Bianco (born 19 February 1968 in Auronzo di Cadore) is an Italian curler.

He participated in the 2006 Winter Olympics, where the Italian men's team finished in seventh place.

Teams

Private life
His younger brother Davide Zandiegiacomo, also an Italian curler, they was teammates played on European and World championships.

References

External links
 
 ABOUT US - zandegiacomo.it

Living people
1968 births
Sportspeople from the Province of Belluno
Italian male curlers
Olympic curlers of Italy
Curlers at the 2006 Winter Olympics
Italian curling champions